The LSU Tigers women's volleyball team represents Louisiana State University in the sport of indoor volleyball.  The Tigers compete in Division I of the National Collegiate Athletics Association (NCAA) and the Southeastern Conference (SEC), and play their home matches in the Pete Maravich Assembly Center on the university's Baton Rouge, Louisiana campus. Since the 2022 season, the head coach is Tonya Johnson, after former long time head coach Fran Flory announced her retirement.

History 
The LSU Tigers volleyball team, originally known as "Lady Tigers", played its first season in 1974. The first coach of the Lady Tigers was Jinks Coleman who compiled a record of 75–22 at LSU from 1974 to 1976. In 1977, Gerry Owens become head volleyball coach at LSU and amassed a record of 95–49 during her 4 years as LSU head coach which ended in 1980. The Lady Tigers brought in a new head coach for the 1981 season. Ruth Nelson guided the Lady Tigers for 4 years from 1981 to 1984 and had a record of 128–98.

In 1985, Scott Luster was named head volleyball coach at LSU. During his 13 years as head coach which ended after the 1997 season, he compiled a record of 308–161. During his tenure, the Lady Tigers made two Final Fours and made the NCAA tournament 6 times in 1986, 1987 and 1989 through 1992. The Lady Tigers also won both the SEC regular season and SEC tournament championships in 1986, 1989, 1990 and 1991. Four LSU Lady Tigers were chosen All-American under Coach Luster. 

In 1997, Fran Flory was hired as head coach for the 1998 season. During her tenure, the Tigers have compiled a record of 336–235. The Tigers have made the NCAA Tournament 6 times in 2005, 2006, 2007, 2008, 2009 and 2010. The Tigers also won the 2009 SEC regular season championship. Flory has coached one All-American during her tenure at LSU.

American Volleyball Coaches Association

All-Americans

Year-by-year results

Arena

Pete Maravich Assembly Center

The Pete Maravich Assembly Center is a 13,215-seat multi-purpose arena in Baton Rouge, Louisiana. The arena opened in 1972 and is home of the LSU Tigers volleyball team. It was originally known as the LSU Assembly Center, but was renamed in honor of Pete Maravich, a Tiger basketball legend, shortly after his death in 1988. The Maravich Center is known to locals as "The PMAC" or "The Palace that Pete Built", or by its more nationally known nickname, "The Deaf Dome", coined by Dick Vitale.

The slightly oval building is located directly to the north of Tiger Stadium, and its bright-white roof can be seen in many telecasts of that stadium.  The arena concourse is divided into four quadrants: Pete Maravich Pass, The Walk of Champions, Heroes Hall and Midway of Memories. The quadrants highlight former LSU Tiger athletes, individual and team awards and memorabilia pertaining to the history of LSU Tigers volleyball.

Practice and Training facilities

LSU Volleyball Practice facility
The LSU Tigers Volleyball Practice facility is located in the Pete Maravich Assembly Center. It includes a state-of-the-art locker room facility, film room, equipment room and training rooms off the arenas southwest corridor. The auxiliary gym located underneath the north section of the arena is a volleyball-only practice facility.

LSU Strength and Conditioning facility
 
The LSU Tigers basketball strength training and conditioning facility is located in the LSU Strength and Conditioning facility. Built in 1997, it is located adjacent to Tiger Stadium. Measuring 10,000-square feet with a flat surface, it has 28 multi-purpose power stations, 36 assorted selectorized machines and 10 dumbbell stations along with a plyometric specific area, medicine balls, hurdles, plyometric boxes and assorted speed and agility equipment. It also features 2 treadmills, 4 stationary bikes, 2 elliptical cross trainers, a stepper and stepmill.

Head coaches

See also
List of NCAA Division I women's volleyball programs

Footnotes

References

External links
 

 
Volleyball clubs established in 1974
1974 establishments in Louisiana